Richard Windbichler (born 2 April 1991) is an Austrian professional footballer who plays as a defender for Chengdu Rongcheng F.C..

Club career
On 20 January 2017, Windbichler joined K League Classic side Ulsan Hyundai. He is the first player from Austria to feature in the K League 1. He left the club at the end of 2018, where his contract expired.

On 28 March 2019, Windbichler signed a short contract with Viborg FF in the Danish 1st Division until the summer 2019. On 28 May 2019, his contract was terminated by mutual consent.

In June 2019, Windbichler joined A-League club Melbourne City on a two-year contract.

On 14 January, 2021, Windbichler signed with K League 1 side, Seongnam FC. He left the club at the end of the season.

Career statistics

References

External links 

1991 births
Living people
Footballers from Vienna
Austrian footballers
Association football defenders
Austria youth international footballers
Austria under-21 international footballers
FC Admira Wacker Mödling players
FK Austria Wien players
Austrian Football Bundesliga players
Ulsan Hyundai FC players
Viborg FF players
Melbourne City FC players
K League 1 players
Danish 1st Division players